Charles D. McDougall (September 21, 1804 – July 25, 1885) was an officer in the United States Army.

Biography
McDougall was born September 21, 1804 to John and Margaret McDougall in Chillicothe, Ohio. On April 15, 1830, he married Maria Griffith Hanson in Indianapolis, Indiana. They would have six children, including Thomas Mower McDougall. Fannie, one of his daughters, would marry Lawrence Sprague Babbitt. He died on July 25, 1885 in Clarke County, Virginia and was buried at Jefferson Barracks National Cemetery.

Career
McDougall was a surgeon in the United States Army during the Blackhawk War, the Seminole Wars, and the American Civil War. Other assignments he received include serving at the United States Military Academy and at Fort Winnebago. On February 25, 1865, he was promoted to Brevet Brigadier General.

References

1804 births
1885 deaths
People from Chillicothe, Ohio
United States Army Medical Corps officers
Union Army surgeons